Air brake may refer to:

 Air brake (aeronautics), a type of flight control system used on aircraft to reduce speed 
 On ground vehicles, (more formally, specified as) compressed-air-actuated braking systems:
 Air brake (road vehicle), friction-mediated type of brake used on large road vehicles in place of hydraulic brakes
 Railway air brake (used on both locomotives, and on towed or pushed cars)